Kaspersky Anti-Virus ( (Antivirus Kasperskogo); formerly known as AntiViral Toolkit Pro; often referred to as KAV) is a proprietary antivirus program developed by Kaspersky Lab. It is designed to protect users from malware and is primarily designed for computers running Microsoft Windows and macOS, although a version for Linux is available for business consumers.

Product 

Kaspersky Anti-Virus features include real-time protection, detection and removal of viruses, trojans, worms, spyware, adware, keyloggers, malicious tools and auto-dialers, as well as detection and removal of rootkits.

Microsoft Windows users may download an antivirus rescue disk that scans the host computer during booting inside an isolated Linux environment. In addition, Kaspersky Anti-Virus prevents itself from being disabled by malware without user permission via password access prompts upon disabling protection elements and changing internal settings. It also scans incoming instant messenger traffic, email traffic, automatically disables links to known malware hosting sites while using Internet Explorer or Firefox, and includes free technical support and free product upgrades within paid-subscription periods.

Limits 
Kaspersky Anti-Virus lacks certain features found in Kaspersky Internet Security. These missing features include a personal firewall, HIPS, Secure Keyboard, AntiSpam, AntiBanner and parental control tools.

Also, Kaspersky, like the majority of its competitors, is incompatible with many other anti-virus and anti-spyware software.

Security vulnerabilities 
In 2005, two critical flaws were discovered in Kaspersky Anti-Virus. One could let attackers commandeer systems that use it, and one allowed CHM files to insert malicious code. Days later, the software maker had offered preliminary protection to customers, and a week later a permanent patch was made available.

Operating systems

Microsoft Windows 
Kaspersky has been initially developed for Windows, hence the system is supported with a client application since the very beginning.

Linux 
An edition of Kaspersky's anti-virus solution for Linux workstations is available to business consumers. It offers many of the features included in the mainstream version for Windows, including on-access and on-demand scanners.

Specialized editions of Kaspersky Anti-Virus are also available for a variety of Linux servers and offer protection from most forms of malware.

Apple Mac OS X / macOS (since 2016) 
The newly released Macintosh capable edition of Kaspersky Anti-Virus is compatible on (Intel Processor Based) Mac OS X Tiger and higher to include the brand new version Mac OS X Snow Leopard, released in August 2009. Kaspersky Lab internal testing concludes consuming only 2% CPU impact on performance and is designed to maintain a user friendly Mac-like interface with which Mac users are familiar. Kaspersky Anti-Virus for Mac contains definitions to detect and block malware affecting Windows, Linux and macOS alike. Kaspersky Anti-Virus for Mac also scans shared folders of users running Windows using Virtual PC on capable Apple Macintosh personal computers.

System requirements 

A DVD-ROM or CD-ROM drive, Internet Explorer 8 or above and Windows Installer 3.0 or above are also required for the installation of Kaspersky Anti-Virus in Windows. The latest version can either be downloaded from their official website or purchased through retail.

Awards 

According to AV-Comparatives, Kaspersky Anti-Virus rates highly amongst virus scanners in terms of detection rates and malware removal, even despite the fact that the program has failed two Virus Bulletin tests in 2007 and another two in 2008. For example, in a Malware Removal test done by AV-Comparatives the Kaspersky Antivirus 2013 was awarded the highest "Advanced+" rating and was able to successfully remove all of 14 malware samples used in that test and in the following File Detection test Kaspersky Antivirus 2013 was also able to achieve the same "Advanced+" rating with a 99.2% sample detection rate. In addition, PC World awarded Kaspersky Anti-Virus 6 the highest rank in its 2007 anti-virus comparative. The well-known and highly regarded Ars Technica lists Kaspersky as one of the best choices for Anti-Virus on the Windows platform.

Kaspersky Anti-Virus was "A-listed" by the UK PC journal PC Pro in late 2007, where it scored very highly for detection and removal of malware. PC Pro attributes this to “a combination of the software’s heuristic scanning and uncompromising approach to database updates. While many packages check for new virus signatures on a daily basis, Kaspersky runs to an hourly schedule, improving your chances of being immunized before an infection reaches it.”

Criticisms and controversies 
In March 2015, Bloomberg accused Kaspersky of having close ties to Russian military and intelligence officials. 
Kaspersky criticized the article in his blog, calling the coverage "sensationalist" and guilty of "exploiting paranoia" to "increase readership".

In June 2015, United States National Security Agency and United Kingdom Government Communications Headquarters agents broke Kaspersky antivirus software so that they could spy on people, leaks indicate.

On 15 March 2022, the German  (BSI) issued a warning against the usage of Kaspersky antivirus and cloud software. For antivirus software to work it requires deep access into the user's system and thus a particularly high level of trust in the software, the vendor and the encrypted update channel. Due to certain actions of Russian military and intelligence forces and the threats issued by Russia against the European Union, the NATO and the Federal Republic of Germany as part of the 2022 Russian invasion of Ukraine, the usage of the software may not be considered trustworthy any longer and would impose a serious risk for a cyber-attack to be successful.  Kaspersky responded that the warning is politically motivated, and that Kaspersky’s data processing centers are located in Switzerland, the source code is available for inspection, and it is independently audited.

See also 

 Antivirus software
 Comparison of antivirus software
 Comparison of firewalls
 Comparison of computer viruses
 Kaspersky Internet Security
 Eugene Kaspersky
 Natalya Kaspersky

References

External links 
 

Antivirus software
Proprietary software
2006 software
Shareware
Windows security software
MacOS security software
Linux security software